The National Breast Cancer Foundation (NBCF) is Australia's leading national body funding breast cancer research with money raised entirely by the Australian public.

Since the establishment of NBCF in 1994, over $190 million has been awarded to 575 research projects across Australia to improve the longevity and quality of life for patients with breast cancer. Research programs funded by NBCF cover every aspect of breast cancer to help further understand risk factors, improve quality of life for breast cancer patients, develop and improve treatment outcomes and ultimately – save more lives.

Since NBCF's inception in 1994, the five-year survival rates for breast cancer has increased from 76% to 91.5%.

NBCF does not receive any government funding and relies on corporate and community support to continue its work. Key fundraising initiatives of NBCF are October Pink Ribbon campaigns, including Pink Ribbon Breakfast and the sale of limited-edition Pink Ribbon Licensed Products. In addition, NBCF works with corporate partners on cause-related campaigns.

NBCF works with third parties on major fund raising events such as the Mother's Day Classic, a national walk or run for breast cancer held annually.

References

External links
 NBCF website
 Pink Ribbon Breakfast website
 Register4 (Australia) website

Breast cancer organizations
Organizations established in 1994
Cancer organisations based in Australia
Organisations based in Sydney
Health charities in Australia
Charities based in Australia
Medical and health organisations based in New South Wales
Non-profit organisations based in New South Wales